"Somebody's Trying to Tell Me Something" is a song by Midnight Oil drawn from their 1982 studio effort 10, 9, 8, 7, 6, 5, 4, 3, 2, 1. The song more or less disappeared after the tour for the album ensued. It was performed on May 18, 2017, at the Vic Theatre in Chicago on The Great Circle tour, when the band played 10, 9, 8, 7, 6, 5, 4, 3, 2, 1 in full.

Run-out groove
The song is noteworthy on vinyl versions for its use of the run-out groove. This was one of the few times in popular music overall, certainly in Australian music, that this was done. The final scream of "breaking me down" is held on the run-out groove, so it appears to go on forever. Since this could not be re-created on the CD, the vocal was held for about 40 seconds and faded out. This use of run-out groove did not appear on all vinyl versions.

Personnel
 Peter Garrett - lead vocals
 Peter Gifford - bass, backup vocals
 Martin Rotsey - guitar
 Jim Moginie - guitar, keyboards
 Rob Hirst - drums, percussion, vocals

Midnight Oil songs
Song recordings produced by Nick Launay
1982 songs
Songs written by Rob Hirst
Songs written by Jim Moginie
Songs written by Peter Garrett
Songs written by Martin Rotsey